The 2015–16 College of Charleston Cougars men's basketball team represented the College of Charleston during the 2015–16 NCAA Division I men's basketball season. The Cougars were led by second-year head coach Earl Grant. The Cougars played their home games at the TD Arena and were in their third year as members of the Colonial Athletic Association. They finished the season 17–14, 8–10 in CAA play to finish in seventh place. They advanced to the quarterfinals of the CAA tournament where they lost to UNC Wilmington.

Previous season 
The Cougars finished the 2015–16 season 9–24, 3–15 in CAA play to finish in last place. They advanced to the quarterfinals of the CAA tournament where they lost to UNC Wilmington.

Departures

Incoming Transfers

Recruiting

Recruiting class of 2016

Roster

Schedule

|-
!colspan=9 style=| Exhibition

|-
!colspan=9 style=| Non-Conference regular season

|-
!colspan=9 style=| CAA regular season

|-
!colspan=9 style=| CAA tournament

References

College of Charleston Cougars men's basketball seasons
College of Charleston
Charleston
Charleston